Firebrick is an unincorporated community in  Lewis County, Kentucky, United States. The Firebrick post office, opened in 1892 with postmaster William Beyerly, closed in January 2004 

It was named for a local brickworks that is no longer in operation.

References

Unincorporated communities in Lewis County, Kentucky
Unincorporated communities in Kentucky